Lost City of the Jungle is a 1946 Universal movie serial.

Plot
Recent atom tests show a certain element - Meteorium 245 - as a defense against the atomic bomb. The evil Eric Hazarias (Lionel Atwill) has traced a Meteorium deposit to the Himalayan province of Pendrang, ruled by casino owner Indra (Helen Bennett). Hazarias fakes his own death and shows up in Pendrang as philanthropist Geoffrey London. With him is Malborn (John Mylong), his faithful secretary who is actually the real mastermind, Hazarias being his decoy. Thus begins a search for Meteorium, under the guise of seeking the lost city of Pendrang. On the trail of Hazarias is United Peace Foundation operative Rod Stanton (Russell Hayden), there to unmask London as Hazarias and put a stop to his evil schemes.

Cast
 Russell Hayden as Rod Stanton, United Peace Foundation operative
 Jane Adams as Marjorie Elmore
 Keye Luke as Tal Shan
 Lionel Atwill as Sir Eric Hazarias/ Geoffrey London
 John Mylong as Malborn, the "real" villain of the serial, posing as Geoffrey London's servant
 George Lynn as Marlow, one of Hazarias' henchmen
 Dick Curtis as Johnson, one of Hazarias' henchmen
 Helen Bennett as Indra
 Ted Hecht as Doc Harris
 John Eldredge as Doctor Elmore
 John Miljan as Doctor Gaffron
 John Gallaudet as Professor Grebb
 Arthur Space as "System" Reeves
 Frances Chung as Lakana Shan
 Gene Roth as Police Captain Hammond

Production
Lionel Atwill was ill and died of lung cancer and pneumonia during the filming of this serial.  Atwill had been cast as the mastermind villain, Sir Eric Hazarias, a foreign spy chief.  Universal did not want to throw out the footage already filmed of their name star, so they chose to adapt the serial.  First, another villain, Malborn, (played by John Mylong), who was originally just a servant of Sir Eric, was reworked to be the boss of Atwill's character and took over most of the active villain requirements of the film.  Secondly, a double of Atwill was used to complete additional scenes involving the character Hazarias, seen either wearing a disguise or filmed from behind or at a distance.  Thirdly, the script was rewritten so that the character Malborn dominated the first several episodes, with only the disguised Hazarias being seen, while the footage filmed with Atwill as Hazarias, often speaking only a few lines and standing around the set of his cave hideout (because he had been too ill to do much more), was shifted to the last half of the serial and supplemented by lengthy shots of his henchmen describing various of their activities to him.

Lost City of the Jungle was Universal's penultimate serial; the final Universal serial was The Mysterious Mr. M, which was also released in 1946.

Chapter titles
 Himalaya Horror
 The Death Flood
 Wave Length for Doom
 The Pit of Pendrang
 Fiery Danger
 Death's Shining Face
 Speedboat Missing
 Fire Jet Torture
 Zalabor Death Watch
 Booby Trap Rendezvous
 Pendrang Guillotine
 Jungle Smash-up
 Atomic Vengeance
Source:

See also
 List of film serials
 List of film serials by studio

References

External links

1946 films
1946 adventure films
American black-and-white films
1940s English-language films
Universal Pictures film serials
Films directed by Ray Taylor
Films directed by Lewis D. Collins
American adventure films
Films with screenplays by Joseph F. Poland
1940s American films